The Nano microprocessor from VIA Technologies is an eighth-generation CPU targeted at the consumer and embedded market.

Desktop and mobile processors

Nano L

"Nano 2000" series (65nm)
 All models support: MMX, SSE, SSE2, SSE3, SSSE3, x86-64, NX bit, VT-x (stepping 3 and higher), VIA PadLock (SHA, AES, RNG), VIA PowerSaver

"Nano 3000" series (65nm)
 All models support: MMX, SSE, SSE2, SSE3, SSSE3, SSE4.1, x86-64, NX bit, VT-x, VIA PadLock (SHA, AES, RNG), VIA PowerSaver

"Nano X2" (40nm)http://www.viaembedded.com/servlet/downloadSvl?id=1373&download_file_id=13043
 All models support: MMX, SSE, SSE2, SSE3, SSSE3, SSE4.1, x86-64, NX bit, VT-x, VIA PadLock (SHA, AES, RNG), VIA PowerSaver
 Two Nano 3000 (Isaiah) in the same die

"Nano QuadCore" (40nm)
 All models support: MMX, SSE, SSE2, SSE3, SSSE3, SSE4.1, x86-64, NX bit, VT-x, VIA PadLock (SHA, AES, RNG), VIA PowerSaver
 Two Nano x2 (Isaiah) in a Multi-chip module

Nano C

"Nano QuadCore" (28nm)
 All models support: MMX, SSE, SSE2, SSE3, SSSE3, SSE4.1, SSE4.2, AVX, AVX2, x86-64, NX bit, VT-x, VIA PadLock (SHA, AES, RNG), VIA PowerSaver
 Similar to Zhaoxin ZX-C

Ultra-low voltage processors

Nano U

"Nano 1000/2000" series (65nm)
 All models support: MMX, SSE, SSE2, SSE3, SSSE3, x86-64, NX bit, VT-x (stepping 3 and higher), VIA PadLock (SHA, AES, RNG), VIA PowerSaver

"Nano 3000" series (65nm)http://www.viaembedded.com/servlet/downloadSvl?id=1370&download_file_id=13044
 All models support: MMX, SSE, SSE2, SSE3, SSSE3, SSE4.1, x86-64, NX bit, VT-x, VIA PadLock (SHA, AES, RNG), VIA PowerSaver

"Nano X2" (40nm)
 All models support: MMX, SSE, SSE2, SSE3, SSSE3, SSE4.1, x86-64, NX bit, VT-x, VIA PadLock (SHA, AES, RNG), VIA PowerSaver
 Two Nano 3000 (Isaiah) in the same die

"Nano QuadCore" (40nm)
 All models support: MMX, SSE, SSE2, SSE3, SSSE3, SSE4.1, x86-64, NX bit, VT-x, VIA PadLock (SHA, AES, RNG), VIA PowerSaver
 Two Nano x2 (Isaiah) in a Multi-chip module

References

External links
 VIA Nano product page

See also
 List of VIA microprocessors

Nano
VIA